Grenå RK is a Danish rugby club in Grenå. They were presumably inactive for a number of years, but are now playing again, though in combination with other teams due to lack of player numbers.

References

Danish rugby union teams